Saguna Brahman (lit. "The Absolute with qualities") came from the Sanskrit  "with qualities, gunas" and Brahman "the Absolute", close to the concept of immanence, the manifested divine presence.

Yoga
Rājarshi (2001: p. 45) conveys his estimation of the historical synthesis of the School of Yoga (one of the six Āstika schools of Hinduism) which he holds introduces the principle of "Isvara" as Saguna Brahman, to reconcile the extreme views of Vedanta's "advandva" and Sankya's "dvandva":
"Introducing the special tattva (principle) called Ishvara by yoga philosophy is a bold attempt to bring reconciliation between the transcendental, nondual monism of vedanta and the pluralistic, dualistic, atheism of sankhya. The composite system of yoga philosophy brings the two doctrines of vedanta and sankya closer to each other and makes them understood as the presentation of the same reality from two different points of view. The nondual approach of vedanta presents the principle of advandva (nonduality of the highest truth at the transcendental level.) The dualistic approach of sankhya presents truth of the same reality but at a lower empirical level, rationally analyzing the principle of dvandva (duality or pairs of opposites). Whereas, yoga philosophy presents the synthesis of vedanta and sankhya, reconciling at once monism and dualism, the supermundane and the empirical."

Vedanta
According to Dvaita of Madhvacharya and Vishistadvaita of Ramanujacharya, Brahman is conceived as Saguna Brahman (personal deity) or ishvara (Lord of the universe) with infinite attributes, including form. However, by contrast with Dvaita, Vishistadvaita use of term Brahman secondarily denoted the world that depends on Brahman, namely all minds and material things constituting Brahman's body. Saguna Brahman is immortal, imperishable, eternal, as clearly stated in the Bhagavad Gita. The personal form indicated is generally Adi Narayana, or Krishna. While the Advaita of Adi Shankara retained both Saguna Brahman (Brahman with qualities) and Nirguna Brahman (Brahman without qualities), but he considered former to be merely illusory. While on the basis of an esoteric enlightened experience (moksha) and scripture (sruti), he holds that only Nirguna Brahman is real. While Dvaita of Madhva and Vishistadvaita of Ramanuja considers Saguna Brahman as the ultimate reality and liberation (moksha) is attained only by the grace of God.

Other
Surya is regarded as Saguna Brahman by Saura (Hinduism), Goddess Shakti (or Parvati, Durga, Kali, Mahalakshmi, or Gayatri) is seen as the Saguna Brahman in Shaktism and Shiva is the Saguna Brahman of Shaivism.

See also
Para Brahman
Nirguna Brahman
Brahman
Mahavishnu
Parasiva
Turiya
Harihara

Notes

References

Bibliography

Hindu philosophical concepts
Names of God in Hinduism